The Blue Eagle is a 1926 American action film directed by John Ford. Prints of the film exist in the Library of Congress film archive and in the UCLA Film and Television Archive, but one reel is missing.

Plot

Cast

 George O'Brien as George Darcy
 Janet Gaynor as Rose Kelly
 William Russell as Big Tim Ryan
 Margaret Livingston as Mrs. Mary Rohan
 Robert Edeson as Chaplain Regan, aka Father Joe
 Philip Ford as Limpy Darcy (as Phillip Ford)
 David Butler as Nick 'Dizzy' Galvani
 Lew Short as Sergeant Kelly
 Ralph Sipperly as Slats "Dip" Mulligan
 Jerry Madden as Baby Tom
 Jack Herrick as "On Da Nose" Sailor (uncredited)
 Jack Pennick as Ship's crewman (uncredited)
 Charles Sullivan as Sailor Giving George Boxing Gloves (uncredited)
 Harry Tenbrook as Bascom, a Stoker (uncredited)

References

External links

1926 films
1926 drama films
1920s action drama films
American action drama films
American silent feature films
American black-and-white films
Films directed by John Ford
Fox Film films
1920s American films
Silent American drama films
Silent action drama films
1920s English-language films